Botikarlapadu is a small village near Atmakur, Nellore, Nellore district, Andhra Pradesh, India. It has a population of approx. 500 people. As of 2011, Botikarlapadu has a population of approx. 500 people.

References 

Villages in Nellore district